Gajendra is a 2004 Tamil language action film directed by Suresh Krishna. The film stars Vijayakanth, Flora and Laya in lead roles. The film, produced by V. A. Durai, was released on 17 September 2004 to negative reviews. The film is remake of Telugu blockbuster film Simhadri and was later dubbed into Hindi as Return of Khuda Gawah in 2010. The film failed at box-office.

Plot
An orphan and good hearted lad Gajendra (Vijayakanth) is 'adopted' and grows up under Azhagarsamy (Sarath Babu) family care in Chennai. The Bond they share is like father and son. (Flora Saini) is Azhagarsamy's granddaughter, and she likes Gajendra a lot. Once a week, Gajendra meets a mentally challenged girl Indu (Laya). He Entertains her provides money for her caretakers.

When Azhagarsamy and his wife (Lavanya) discover  wants to marry Gajendra, Azhagarsamy decides to get them married. He makes a formal announcement to officially adopt Gajendra. At this time, it is revealed that Gajendra is very close to Indu. The alliance breaks off when Gajendra refuses to leave Indu (who is suspected to be his mistress).

Meanwhile, two separate groups are in search of Gajendra. They find him at the banks of Kaveri River along with Indu.  In the ensuing confrontation between one group of gangsters and Gajendra, Azhagarsamy and his family are surprised to see that Gajendra, who used to be calm and composed, is ruthlessly killing many rowdies without mercy. Meanwhile, Indu gets injured. Gajendra is helped by the second group, who call him 'Andhra Gaja'. When Indu comes back to her senses, she remembers her past and the first thing she does is stab Gajendra with an iron pole. Gajendra is hospitalized in critical condition. Then we see many buses carrying hoards of people demanding to see 'Andhra Gaja'.  The leader of the second group, who was searching for Gajendra, explains the 'Andhra Gaja' story in a flashback.

In the flashback, it is revealed that Azhagarsamy's oldest daughter Mahalakshmi (Seetha) elopes with her lover, a Hyderabadi named Aravind (Rajeev). After some harsh words and saddened over Azhagarsamy's rejection over her choice to marry her love, they both settle in Andhra Pradesh. Learning of the sadness surrounding Azhagarsamy and his wife, Gajendra takes up the job of uniting the family and visits Hyderabad. He joins the medical and spiritual therapy spa operated by Mahalakshmi and her family under the disguise of a patient.

He finds that Indu is Azhagarsamy's first granddaughter. He convinces the separated family to reunite and ask for forgiveness. During this time, Mahalakshmi is killed by a local goon Chhota Babu (Rajat Bedi). A don named  Rana (Nawab Shah) controls the mafia of Andhra Pradesh. Chhota and Rana belong to the same mafia. Gajendra takes the law into his hands and eradicates Bala and his small gang in Andhra Pradesh. The local Andhra people start calling him 'Andhra Gaja'. In the ensuing scenes, Gajendra finds himself developing into "Gajendra," eradicating Rana's network and illegal activities. Indu finds herself alone and constantly worrying about him.  She proposes to her father that they should return to Tamilnadu because she cannot stand their home without her mother, and Gajendra ignores her now.

Indu and Aravind decide to return to Chennai. Gajendra receives a call that Indu's father is carrying a bomb in his briefcase. Aravind is seen rushing to catch a moving train, and Indu was about to lend him a hand. Unable to warn him, Gajendra has two choices: to let Indu's father die so people on the train can live, or let the bomb kill everyone on board, including Indu and her father.

Gajendra chooses the first option. As soon as Aravind catches the train bar handle, Gajendra shoots him in the back. Surprised at Gajendra's action, Indu jumps off the train to catch her falling father, and she gets hit her head against a pole, causing her amnesia and becoming mentally challenged. After the flashback ends, people are seen and heard chanting Gaja Gaja outside the hospital. Rana and his men arrive at the hospital to finish off Gajendra. But Gajendra has gained consciousness, and with the help of his friends, police and family (now reunited), he takes down Rana and his army.

Gajendra was young man, who hails from Petaling Jaya, Selangor. He was a simple man who wanted to take a break from the overrated commitment that is love. That all changed, when he came across a young woman named Nattali, whilst attending university. After some setbacks along the way, he decided to give his heart another go at love. He started small by first liking her social media stories and post whilst occasionally talking to her when the opportunities arise.

Several events followed including a few times when she went to watch and cheer for the university football team as well as a drinking session convinced him to pursue her seriously. He started by assembling his dream team of advisors featuring his classmates who was president of the society where Nattali was a committee member as well as setting up a weekly updates session with his long-time junior Edward, a friend of Nattali. Gajen took his time and coordinated as well as planning several coincidence to unintentionally get closer to her girl.

His slowly but surely tactic bore fruit when he managed to get her on a date to get a Christmas present (although he is not a Christian). The rest from then on is history, Gajen and Nattali live happily ever after.

Cast
Vijayakanth as Gajendran aka Andhra Gaja
Flora as Kasthuri
Laya as Indhu
Sarath Babu as Azhagarsamy / Azhagar Ayya
Nawab Shah as Rana
Rajat Bedi as Chotta Babu
Seetha as Mahalakshmi
Rajeev as Aravind
Radha Ravi as ACP Soukath Ali
Ramesh Khanna as Pazhaniappan
Vinu Chakravarthy as Peedhambaram
Nizhalgal Ravi as Azhagarsamy' second son-in-law
Mahanadi Shankar
M. S. Bhaskar as Fake patient
Raj Kapoor as Rana's Henchman
Lavanya

Production
The film was shot at locations in Rameswaram, Pushkarani, Tiruchandur, Vishakhapatnam, Chennai and Hyderabad. One of the fight scenes was picturised in the forest areas near Thalakkonam within 15 days while another fight scene was shot in the Godavari river in five days in which a stunt man lost his life in the water.

Soundtrack

The film score and the soundtrack were composed by Deva. The soundtrack, released in 26 August 2004, features 5 tracks but only two songs are placed in the film. The lyrics written by Kabilan and Pa. Vijay. "Gaja Varanda" was reused from Deva's own Kannada song "Banda Nodamma" for Kannada film Kadamba (2003) also directed by Suresh Krishna.

Release and reception
The film's release was postponed for some months, producer Durai's financial troubles and Vijayakanth's controversial statements against Pattali Makkal Aatchi were said to be the reason for delays.

IndiaGlitz.com described the film as a "bad remake". Sify.com said that the film is a "waste of time". Malathi Rangarajan of The Hindu called it "another Vijayakanth product that deifies the hero." Visual Dasan of Kalki noted many of the Vijayakanth's dialogues have indirect political overtones while also stating the film despite being remade from a Telugu film, it heavily reminds of Baasha and called the film a massive bore.

References

External links 
 

2004 films
2004 action drama films
Films shot in Telangana
Tamil remakes of Telugu films
Films shot in Chennai
Indian action drama films
2000s masala films
Films directed by Suresh Krissna
Films scored by Deva (composer)
2000s Tamil-language films